Teteringen is a city district / village in the northeast of Breda in the Dutch province of North Brabant. It is located in the municipality of Breda, about 4 km north of the city centre.

Teteringen was a separate municipality until 1997, when it became part of Breda.

References

Municipalities of the Netherlands disestablished in 1997
Populated places in North Brabant
Former municipalities of North Brabant
Breda